This is a list of the weekly Canadian RPM magazine number one Top Singles chart of 1973.

See also
1973 in music

List of Billboard Hot 100 number ones of 1973
List of Cashbox Top 100 number-one singles of 1973

References
Notes

External links
 Read about RPM Magazine at the AV Trust
 Search RPM charts here  at Library and Archives Canada

1973 in Canadian music
Canada Singles
1973